James Davison was a member of the Wisconsin State Assembly.

Biography
Davison was born on December 6, 1828 near what was then Belfast, Ireland. After residing in West Bend, Wisconsin, he moved to Dodge County, Wisconsin in 1868.

Assembly career
Davison was a member of the Assembly in 1879. He was a Democrat.

References

Irish emigrants to the United States (before 1923)
People from West Bend, Wisconsin
People from Dodge County, Wisconsin
Democratic Party members of the Wisconsin State Assembly
1828 births
Year of death missing